Yettishar (Uyghur: يەتتىشەر دۆلەتى; ; meaning "Seven Cities" or "Heptapolis"), commonly known as Kashgaria, was a short-lived Sunni Muslim Turkic state that existed in Xinjiang between 1865 and 1877 during the Dungan Revolt against the Qing dynasty. The seven cities were Kashgar, Khotan, Yarkand, Yengisar, Aksu, Kucha and Korla. In 1873, the state was recognized by the Ottoman Empire as a vassal. On 18 December 1877, the army of the Qing entered Kashgar, bringing the state to an end.

History

Background

By the 1860s, Xinjiang had been under Qing rule for a century. The area had been conquered in 1759 from the Dzungar Khanate whose core population, the Oirats, subsequently became the targets of genocide. However, as Xinjiang consisted mostly of semi-arid or desert lands, these were not attractive to potential Han settlers except some traders, so other people such as Uyghurs settled in the area.

The ethnic group known today as Uyghur people was not known by the term "Uyghur" up to the 20th century. The Uzbeks that dwelled close to present-day Xinjiang were collectively called "Andijanis" or "Kokandis", while the Uyghurs in the Tarim Basin were known as "Turki", probably due to their language. There were also Uyghur immigrants residing in Ili area that were called "Taranchi". The modern term "Uyghur" was assigned to this ethnic group by the newly created Soviet Union in 1921 at a conference in Tashkent. As a result, sources from the period of the Dungan revolt make no mentions of Uyghurs. The conflict was mainly an ethnic and religious war fought by members of the Muslim Hui and other Muslim ethnic groups in China's Shaanxi, Ningxia and Gansu provinces, as well as in Xinjiang, between 1862 and 1877.

Thousands of Muslim refugees from Shaanxi fled to Gansu. Some of them formed significant battalions in eastern Gansu, intending to reconquer their lands in Shaanxi. While the Hui rebels were preparing to attack Gansu and Shaanxi, Yaqub Beg, an ethnic Uzbek or Tajik commander from the Kokand Khanate, fled from the Khanate in 1865 after losing Tashkent to the Russians, settled in Kashgar and soon managed to take complete control of the oasis towns surrounding Tarim Basin in southern Xinjiang.

Yaqub beg

Yaqub Beg was born in the town of Piskent, in the Khanate of Kokand (now in Uzbekistan). During the Dungan revolt, he conquered the Tarim Basin and enthroned himself as the ruler of Yettishar when the Chinese were expelled from the region in 1864. During his short-lived reign, Yaqub beg entered into relations with foreign powers and signed respective treaties with the Russian and British Empires. However, he failed to receive a meaningful help from these states when he was in need of their support against China.

Yaqub Beg was given the title of "Athalik Ghazi" or "Champion Father of the Faithful" by the Emir of Bukhara in 1866. The Ottoman Sultan presented him with the title of Emir. 

However, Yaqub Beg's rule was unpopular among the native population of Yettishar. One of his Kashgari subjects, a warrior and the son of a chieftain, described his rule with the following: "During the Chinese rule there was everything; there is nothing now." A substantial decrease in trade also ensued during his years in power. Yaqub Beg was disliked by his Turkic Muslim subjects, who burdened them with heavy taxes and subjected them to a harsh version of Islamic Sharia law.

Korean historian Kim Hodong points out the fact that his disastrous and inexact commands failed the locals and they in turn welcomed the return of Chinese troops. Qing dynasty general Zuo Zongtang wrote that "The Andijanis are tyrannical to their people; government troops should comfort them with benevolence. The Andijanis are greedy in extorting from the people; government troops should rectify this by being generous."

Downfall (1877)

In the late 1870s, the Qing decided to reconquer Xinjiang with General Zuo Zongtang as its commander. As Zuo moved into Xinjiang to crush the Muslim rebels under Yaqub Beg, he was joined by Dungan Khufiyya Sufi General Ma Anliang and his forces, which were composed entirely out of Muslim Dungan people. Ma Anliang and his Dungan troops fought alongside Zuo Zongtang to attack the Muslim rebel forces. In addition, General Dong Fuxiang had an army of both Hans and Dungan people, and his army took the Kashgar and Khotan areas during the reconquest. Also, the Shaanxi Gedimu Dungan Generals Cui Wei and Hua Decai, who had defected back to the Qing, joined Zuo Zongtang and led the attack on Yaqub Beg's forces in Xinjiang.

General Zuo implemented a conciliatory policy toward the Muslim rebels, pardoning those who did not rebel and those who surrendered if they had joined in only for religious reasons. If rebels assisted the government against the rebel Muslims they received rewards. In contrast to General Zuo, the Manchu leader Dorongga sought to massacre all the Muslims and saw them all as the enemy. Zuo also instructed General Zhang Yao that "The Andijanis are tyrannical to their people; government troops should comfort them with benevolence. The Andijanis are greedy in extorting from the people; the government troops should rectify this by being generous", telling him to not mistreat the Turkic Muslim natives of Xinjiang. Zuo wrote that the main targets were only the "die-hard partisans" and their leaders, Yaqub Beg and Bai Yanhu. The natives were not blamed or mistreated by the Qing troops, a Russian wrote that soldiers under General Liu "acted very judiciously with regard to the prisoners whom he took ... His treatment of these men was calculated to have a good influence in favour of the Chinese."

Zuo Zongtang, previously a general in the Xiang Army, was the commander in chief of all Qing troops participating in this counterinsurgency. His subordinates were the Han Chinese General Liu Jintang and Manchu Jin Shun. Liu Jintang's army had modern German artillery, which Jin Shun's forces lacked and neither was Jin's advance as rapid as Liu's. After Liu bombarded Ku-mu-ti, Muslim rebel casualties numbered 6,000 dead while Bai Yanhu was forced to flee for his life. Thereafter Qing forces entered Ürümqi unopposed. Zuo wrote that Yaqub Beg's soldiers had modern western weapons but were cowardly: "The Andijani chieftain Yaqub Beg has fairly good firearms. He has foreign rifles and foreign guns, including cannon using explosive shells [Kai Hua Pao]; but his are not as good nor as effective as those in the possession of our government forces. His men are not good marksmen, and when repulsed they simply ran away."

In December 1877, all of Kashgar was conquered. Muhammad Ayub with the Dungan detachments took refuge in the possessions of Russia. The power of the Qing dynasty was restored over all of Xinjiang, except for the Ili region, which was returned by Russia to China under the Treaty of Saint Petersburg.

Death of Yaqub Beg

The manner of Yaqub Beg's death is unclear. The Times of London and the Russian Turkestan Gazette both reported that he had died after a short illness. The contemporaneous historian Musa Sayrami (1836–1917)  states that he was poisoned on May 30, 1877 in Korla by the former hakim (local city ruler) of Yarkand, Niyaz Hakim Beg, after the latter concluded a conspiracy agreement with the Qing (Chinese) forces in Jungaria. However, Niyaz Beg himself, in a letter to the Qing authorities, denied his involvement in the death of Yaqub Beg, and claimed that the Kashgarian ruler committed suicide. Some say that he was killed in battle with the Chinese. Modern historians, according to Kim Hodong, think that natural death (of a stroke) is the most plausible explanation.

Notes

References

Xinjiang
Former countries in Chinese history
1865 by country
Vassal states of the Ottoman Empire